Kashiling Adake (born 18 December 1992) is an Indian professional Kabaddi player. He has played for Dabang Delhi, U Mumba and Bengaluru Bulls in Pro Kabaddi League.
He went unsold in the recently held PKL 2019 auction.

Early life 
He was born in Sangli district of the state Maharashtra in India.

Pro Kabaddi League
He debut in PKL in Season 1 and played for Dabang Delhi in first four seasons. He played for U Mumba in Season 5. He played for Bengaluru Bulls in Season 6. He is the first player to score 15 raid points in 1st-Half in a match in PKL Season 5. He also scored 24 points in a match against Telugu Titans.

References 

Indian kabaddi players
1992 births
Living people
People from Sangli district
Kabaddi players from Maharashtra
Pro Kabaddi League players